Video Single Disc (VSD) is a disc-based format that carried the same analog video information as a LaserDisc, but on a 12-centimetre (4.75 inch) diameter CD-DA-sized disc. It was spearheaded by Sony and was released in Japan in 1990. It was a new variety of laserdisc and variation on the CD Video (CD-V) format, except that VSD disc carried only a video track (of up to 5 minutes' duration), and its associated audio, with no CD-compatible partition. The disc is the same size as a standard CD and holds five minutes of video with digital sound.  It did not have any additional audio tracks like CD-V.  Like CD-V, VSD discs could be played back by multi-disc or LaserDisc players that had VSD playback capability.

Release
Upon release, the Video Single Disc was seen as a possible replacement for the failing “CD Video” format, which had confused the public with its combination of five minutes of video and 20 minutes of audio.

Cost
In Japan the Video Single Disc (VSD) was listed at around US$8 which was half the price of the (US$16) CD Video.

Popularity
VSDs were popular only in Japan and other parts of Asia, and was never marketed or introduced elsewhere in the world, but the format did get used once in the United States for a promotional movie teaser and trailer disc to accompany early pressings of the Terminator 2: Judgment Day movie when it was released on LaserDisc in 1991.

See also
 CD Video
 Video CD

References

External links
 The LaserDisc Database, including VSD

120 mm discs
Audio storage
Video storage
LaserDisc
Discontinued media formats